Abraham "Abba" Gindin (born 24 December 1945 in Helsinki, Finland) is a former Israeli professional football player.

Early life
Gindin was born and raised in Finland and grew up playing ice hockey and football for Makkabi Helsinki. At the age of 18, he left Finland for his sister's wedding, who was then living on kibbutz Ein HaShofet.

Professional career
Gindin spent eleven seasons with Hapoel Haifa. He made six appearances for the Israel national football team.

References

1946 births
Living people
Finnish Jews
Israeli Jews
Israeli footballers
Association football forwards
Hapoel Haifa F.C. players
Liga Leumit players
Israel international footballers
Footballers from Helsinki
Finnish emigrants to Israel
Israeli Footballer of the Year recipients